Sorin Cigan (born 29 May 1964) is a Romanian former professional footballer who played as a striker and currently a manager. In Romania Cigan played mostly for Bihor Oradea, but he had his best seasons at Brașov, then he played for rest of his career in Hungary, where he was a well known player, playing along his career for Budapest most important clubs Ferencváros and Újpest among other clubs.

His son, Cristian Cigan is also a footballer.

In June 2009 Cigan was involved in a scandal of match fixing, he was accused of receiving money from ACU Arad to convince Bihor Oradea players to let ACU win. In 2013 he was convicted at 3 years of suspended sentence.

Honours
Újpest
 Magyar Kupa: 1991–92
Ferencváros
Magyar Kupa: 1992–93, 1993–94

References

External links

 
 Sorin Cigan at Magyarfutball.hu

1964 births
Living people
Romanian footballers
Association football forwards
Liga I players
Liga II players
Nemzeti Bajnokság I players
Nemzeti Bajnokság II players
FC Bihor Oradea players
FC UTA Arad players
FC Brașov (1936) players
Újpest FC players
Ferencvárosi TC footballers
Vasas SC players
Kiskőrösi FC footballers
FC Sopron players
Romanian expatriate footballers
Romanian expatriate sportspeople in Hungary
Expatriate footballers in Hungary
Romanian football managers
FC UTA Arad managers
Romania international footballers